Kleinburg is an unincorporated village in the city of Vaughan, Ontario, Canada. It is home to the McMichael Canadian Art Collection, an art gallery with a focus on the Group of Seven, and the Kortright Centre for Conservation. In 2001, the village and its surrounding communities had a population of 4,595; the village itself has 282 dwellings, with a population of 952. Kleinburg comprises a narrow section of hilly landscape situated between two branches of the Humber River. The historic village is bounded by Highway 27 on the west and Stegman’s Mill Road to the east. Kleinburg has subsumed the nearby hamlet of Nashville, but it has not itself been fully subsumed into the main urban area of Vaughan.

Geography
The village is located between two branches of the Humber River, and features dense forests throughout its 1.05 km² of land area. Its northern and western peripheries are primarily agricultural.

History
The community was founded in 1848 by John Nicholas Kline (1825–1854), a German-Canadian settler. A direct translation of the German word Kleinburg is 'small castle'. Residents argue that the community of Kleinburg could be named after its founder or after its landscape (although the latter would necessitate the spelling Kleinberg, which is German for 'small mountain').

In its early days, Kleinburg was dependent on its many flour and wheat mills, located off the Humber River.

Kleinburg has historically been a small, quiet town, but it now attracts many affluent visitors and residents. Housing developments began during the 1950s in the west and continued during the 1970s in the southeast of Kleinburg. Other developments occurred during 1993 in the south, 1998 in the northeast, and during the 2000s in the north. During its major expansion in the 1990s and early 2000s, many new large homes were built.

Main Street
The historic commercial district of Kleinburg along Islington Avenue has many heritage buildings, as well as modern developments with mixed residential and commercial uses.  Main street has local shops, restaurants, and national chains including Royal Bank. Its oldest extant building, built in 1867, is home of The Doctor's House restaurant.

Local attractions include the McMichael Art Gallery, Kortright Centre, Humber River Trails, Bindertwine Park, Pierre Berton Heritage Centre, and Copper Creek Golf Course.

Politics
Kleinburg is not an incorporated entity; it has no political jurisdiction and no geopolitically-defined boundaries. Residents vote for a councillor in ward 1 of Vaughan City Council.

The community of Nashville, though distinct from Kleinburg, is considered part of Kleinburg. Residents of Nashville receive many of their services, such as postal and medical services, within Kleinburg.

Education
Most non-Catholic students were once bused to nearby King City Secondary School in King City. Since the opening of Emily Carr Secondary School, busing was eliminated, forcing students to walk far to get to the school as not even public busing services the area. There are not enough students for Kleinburg's own secondary school. However, there is a private school in the area, known as The Hill Academy (K-12). In 2008, the oldest and most historical school, Kleinburg Public Elementary school, was demolished and a new public elementary school by the same name was built and opened in September 2009. There are 5 schools in Kleinburg:
Kleinburg Christian Academy (Private Elementary)
Kleinburg Public Elementary School (Public Elementary)
Ecole La Fontaine (French Public Elementary School)
Montessori School of Kleinburg (Private School)
The Hill Academy (Private Secondary for student-athletes)
Pope Francis Catholic School (Public Catholic School)

Parks and recreation
Kleinburg is home to several parks, all of which are operated by the city of Vaughan's Parks and Forestry Operations.

 Bindertwine Park
 Butterfly Heights
 East Corners Park
 Ross Gurreri Park
 Secord Park
 Summit Park
 Tinsmith Parkette
 Treelawn Parkette
 Wishing Well Park
 Woodgate Park
While Kleinburg does not have its own community centre, its residents make use of the Al Palladini Community Centre, located in nearby Woodbridge.

Culture
Binder Twine is a festival held annually that attracts 25,000 people on average. This tradition began in 1890 by Charles Shaw Jr. who distributed binder twine to local farmers. Kleinburg also has a Christmas tree lighting celebration where the community comes together to donate to The Red Bow Campaign and the KARA Holiday Food Drive while waiting for the lighting of the tree in front of the Kline house. There is also Canada Day in Kleinburg and Cartunes in Kleinburg events which allow the community to celebrate the history of the village.

In film
Kleinburg is home to the Cinespace Film Studios (formerly Toronto International Film Studios), a centre for television and motion picture production. The TV show The Forest Rangers was filmed here from 1963 to 1965. A reunion was held at the studios in June, 2013 with Gordon Pinsent and nine junior rangers in attendance.

Other films shot at the studio between 1960 and 1990 include: The Hired Gun, The Fox, The First Time, The Reincarnate, Mahoney's Last Stand, Equus, Recommendation for Mercy, Shoot, Welcome to Blood City, Death Weekend, The Shape of Things to Come, Rituals, Riel, Fish Hawk, The Amateur, Sesame Street Presents Follow That Bird, The Fly, The Wars, Love at Stake and Divided Loyalities. Television shows filmed here include: Hudson's Bay, The Forest Rangers, Hatch's Mill, The Adventures of Timothy Pilgrim, Search and Rescue, Matt and Jenny, The Great Detective and The Littlest Hobo.

Downtown Kleinburg and the farmland surrounding it featured significantly in the 1st season of the 1971 television series, Dr. Simon Locke.

In 2006, the movie The Sentinel was filmed at the McMichael Art Gallery.  In the movie, all of the Camp David scenes, both indoor and outdoor, were filmed on the grounds of the McMichael Art Gallery, most notably the scene on the "Wedding Hill" where they filmed the  president's helicopter taking off and being shot down by a missile (the explosion was added in after using special effects).

In 2015, Cinespace moved out of the studios they had been renting. The Vaughan Sports Centre, a private company, has repurposed them as baseball training facilities.

Notable residents
Kleinburg was home to Canadian author Pierre Berton for nearly 50 years until his death in 2004, and to his friend and business associate John G. McClelland, co-founder of McClelland & Stewart. Kleinburg was also the home of former prime minister Lester B. Pearson. Kleinburg is the current home of Ontario's youngest Minister of Education, Stephen Lecce.

References

External links
 Kleinburg Village website
 The Canadian Encyclopedia – Kleinburg
 Kleinburg Nashville Historical Collection

Neighbourhoods in Vaughan
Populated places established in 1848